The Men's 50 metre rifle three positions event at the 2018 Commonwealth Games was held on 14 April at the Belmont Shooting Centre, Brisbane.

Results

Qualification
Shooters fired at the target 40 times each in the kneeling / prone / standing positions (120 shots in total). The top eight shooters advanced to the final.

Final
Shooters fired at the target 15 times each in the kneeling / prone positions, then 10 times in the standing position (after which the two lowest-ranked shooters were eliminated). The lowest-ranked shooter was then eliminated for each of the last five shots taken.

References

Men's 50 metre three positions